Andriy Boyko (born 27 April 1981) is a Ukrainian football defender who plays for Trat.

External links 
Profile on official Tavriya website 

Ukrainian footballers
1981 births
Living people
SC Tavriya Simferopol players
FC Mariupol players
FC Hoverla Uzhhorod players
FC Kryvbas Kryvyi Rih players
Expatriate footballers in Thailand
Andriy Boyko
Association football defenders
People from Bila Tserkva
Sportspeople from Kyiv Oblast